was a Japanese football player and manager. He played for Japan national team. He also managed Japan national team.

Club career
Ninomiya was born in Hyogo Prefecture on 22 November 1917. He played for Keio BRB was consisted of his alma mater Keio University players and graduates. He won Emperor's Cup 7 times (1936, 1937, 1939, 1940, 1951, 1952 and 1954).

National team career
On 16 June 1940, when Ninomiya was a Keio University student, he debuted for Japan national team against Philippines and Japan won the match. This match was the first match since 1936 Summer Olympics and the only match in the 1940s in Japan's International A Match due to World War II.

After World War II, Japan national team was resumed activities in 1951. Ninomiya played as playing manager at 1951 Asian Games. He also played at 1954 Asian Games. He played 6 games and scored 1 goal for Japan until 1954.

Coaching career
After World War II, in 1951, player Ninomiya named manager for Japan national team for 1951 Asian Games and he managed 3 matches as playing manager. After 1951 Asian Games, he resigned.

On 7 March 2000, Ninomiya died of pneumonia in Tokyo at the age of 82. In 2006, he was selected Japan Football Hall of Fame.

National team statistics

Honours
Japan
Asian Games Bronze medal: 1951

References

External links
 
 Japan National Football Team Database
Japan Football Hall of Fame at Japan Football Association

1917 births
2000 deaths
Keio University alumni
Association football people from Hyōgo Prefecture
Japanese footballers
Japan international footballers
Japanese football managers
Japan national football team managers
Asian Games medalists in football
Footballers at the 1951 Asian Games
Medalists at the 1951 Asian Games
Footballers at the 1954 Asian Games
Association football forwards
Asian Games bronze medalists for Japan